Cinmeon Henry Bowers (born May 1, 1993) is an American professional basketball player who last played for FMP of the Adriatic League.

Professional career 
In February 2018, Bowers signed with Earth Friends Tokyo Z in Japan. Bowers was added to the opening night roster of the Wisconsin Herd on November 1, 2018, after trying out for the team. He was waived by the Herd on December 5, 2018. On December 20, 2018, he signed for FMP of the Basketball League of Serbia and the Adriatic League. FMP parted ways with him in February 2019.

The Basketball Tournament
Cinmeon Bowers played for the Golden Eagles in the 2018 edition of The Basketball Tournament. In 5 games, he averaged 3.8 points, .8 assists, and 1.4 rebounds per game. The Golden Eagles reached the semi-finals before falling to Overseas Elite.

References

External links
 Auburn Tigers bio

1993 births
Living people
ABA League players
American expatriate basketball people in Israel
American expatriate basketball people in Japan
American expatriate basketball people in the Philippines
American expatriate basketball people in Serbia
American men's basketball players
Auburn Tigers men's basketball players
Basketball players from Wisconsin
Earth Friends Tokyo Z players
Hapoel Galil Elyon players
KK FMP players
Magnolia Hotshots players
Philippine Basketball Association imports
Sportspeople from Racine, Wisconsin
Wisconsin Herd players
Power forwards (basketball)
Rufus King International High School alumni